The year 1623 in science and technology involved some significant events.

Astronomy
 July 16 – Great conjunction of Jupiter and Saturn, the closest together the two planets will come until 2020.

Biology
 Apple orchard at Grönsö Manor in Sweden planted; it will still be productive into the 21st century.

Psychology
 Erotomania is first mentioned in a psychiatric treatise.

Technology
 Wilhelm Schickard draws a calculating clock on a letter to Kepler. This will be the first of five unsuccessful attempts at designing a direct entry calculating clock in the 17th century (including the designs of Tito Burattini, Samuel Morland and René Grillet).

Births
 June 19 – Blaise Pascal, French mathematician and physicist (died 1662)
 July 12 – Elizabeth Walker, English pharmacist (born 1690)
 August 26 – Johann Sigismund Elsholtz, German naturalist and physician (died 1688)
 September 1 – Caspar Schamberger, German surgeon and merchant (died 1706)
 September 23 – Georg Balthasar Metzger, German physician and scientist (died 1687)
 October 9 – Ferdinand Verbiest, Flemish Jesuit Sinologist and astronomer (died 1688)
 Margaret Lucas, later Margaret Cavendish, Duchess of Newcastle-upon-Tyne, English natural philosopher (died 1673)

Deaths
 May 26 – Francis Anthony, English apothecary and physician (born 1550)
 December 24 – Michiel Coignet, Flemish engineer, cosmographer, mathematician and scientific instrument-maker (born 1549)

References

 
17th century in science
1620s in science